The Vejce ambush or Vejce Massacre occurred when ethnic Albanian rebels killed eight soldiers of the ARM, on the late afternoon of 28 April 2001 near Vejce, a village in the Šar Mountains, Macedonia. It represents the heaviest death toll for the government forces in a single incident during the Insurgency in the Republic of Macedonia.

Aftermath

Reactions 
NATO Secretary General George Robertson, after referring to the rebels as "a bunch of murderous thugs," remarked that:

Vasiliki P. Neofotistos writes of "the gruesome event that came to be known as the Vejce massacre" and its aftermath:

 According to the Guardian:"They were hit by everything," said Nikola Dimitrov, then-security adviser to President Boris Trajkovski, current Macedonian foreign minister. "They used hand grenades, rocket launchers and machine guns." 

"He said the guerrilla's had gone out of their way to disfigure the corpses. "It's unbelievable, and it's going to damage the political process. Now it will be so difficult to proceed."

References

Attacks in Europe in 2001
2001 insurgency in Macedonia
Tetovo Municipality
April 2001 events in Europe
Ambushes in Europe
Massacres in North Macedonia
Massacres in 2001